Afonso Arinos de Melo Franco (May 1, 1868 – February 19, 1916) was a Brazilian journalist, writer and jurist.

In the 19th century, he was recognized as one of the most influential intellectuals of his time. His work is part of Brazil's most prestigious literature and contains a strong message of social criticism.

Works
 Os jagunços (1897)
 Pelo sertão (1898)

External links

1868 births
1916 deaths
Brazilian male writers
People from Minas Gerais